August Ludwig Friedrich Wilhelm Seebeck (27 December 1805 in Jena – 19 March 1849 in Dresden) was a scientist at the Technische Universität Dresden.

Seebeck is primarily remembered for his work on sound and hearing, in particular with experiments with an acoustic siren that demonstrated that the pitch of a tone did not depend on the tone having a fundamental frequency component of the pitch frequency.  His observations and theories are now highly regarded, but historically suffered in the battle with Ohm and Helmholtz, who took a Fourier analysis view of the sound of tones.

With respect to Ohm's acoustic law, historians have concluded that Seebeck "successfully discredited the hypothesis and forced Ohm to withdraw from the field."

See also
Auditory science
Sound localization
Temporal theory (hearing)

References

External links
 TUD page with photo

19th-century German physicists
1805 births
1849 deaths
Auditory scientists